Viktor Nikitin may refer to:

 Victor Ivanovich Nikitin (1911–1994), Soviet tenor
 Viktor Nikitin (pilot) (1893–1933), Russian and Serbian pilot
 Viktor Nikitin (writer) (1960–2020), Russian writer and editor